Leporacanthicus galaxias is a species of armored catfish native to Brazil and Venezuela.  This species grows to a length of  SL.   L. galaxias originates from fast flowing rapids.

References 
 

Ancistrini
Fish of Brazil
Fish of Venezuela
Fish described in 1989